The 2018–19 New Hampshire Wildcats men's basketball team represented the University of New Hampshire in the 2018–19 NCAA Division I men's basketball season. They played their home games at the Lundholm Gym in Durham, New Hampshire and were led by 14th-year head coach Bill Herrion. They finished the season 5–24 overall, 3–13 in conference play to finish in a tie for eighth place. They failed to qualify for the 2019 America East men's basketball tournament.

Previous season
The Wildcats finished the 2017–18 season 10–21, 6–10 in the America East Conference play to finish in a tie for sixth place. In the America East tournament, they lost to Hartford in the quarterfinals.

Roster

Schedule and results

|-
!colspan=12 style=| Non-conference regular season

|-
!colspan=9 style=| America East Conference regular season

|-

Source

References

New Hampshire Wildcats men's basketball seasons
New Hampshire Wildcats
2018 in sports in New Hampshire